Bangor Erris is a town in Kiltane parish in Erris, County Mayo, Ireland with a population of over 300. It is on the banks of the Owenmore River and is a "gateway" to the Erris Peninsula linking Belmullet with Ballina and Westport. It is located at the foot of the "Bangor Trail" a 22-mile mountain pass across the Nephin Beg Mountain Range to Newport. Approximately 2 km away is Carrowmore Lake, Bangor is a centre for wild atlantic salmon and sea trout fishing.  Bangor Erris is located in the Parish of Kiltane. Due west from Bangor are the towns of Belmullet, Geesala, Mulranny, Westport and Doolough.

History
The original name for Bangor was Doire Choinadaigh (Kennedy's Wood), a name found on maps from 1724 to 1829. The place was also called 'Coineadach' by John O'Donovan in the Ordnance Survey Name Books of 1838.  In 1802 when James McPartlan (Statistical Survey p. 159) surveyed the area, he called the village 'Cahal' and noted that there were regular fairs held there at that time. Locally the village was known as 'Aonach Cathail' because a wealthy buyer of that name was a regular at the fair days.  The name 'Bangor' was given to the village by Major Denis Bingham who established the town of Bangor Erris.

The reason Bangor was chosen as a site for Bingham's town was because it was situated at the crossroads of two old roads which were in use from about the middle of the 18th century.  One road led from Carne (Mullet peninsula) to Castlebar and the other went from Inver (Kilcommon) to Newport. Both roads were repaired by order of the County Assizes in 1793.  The crossroads was well sheltered from the worst of the prevailing winds and its situation on the banks of the Owenmore River also made it a suitable site.

Major Bingham introduced the Revenue Police to stamp out the illicit distillation of drink, in reality it was to get personal protection for himself in his house Bingham Lodge on the western edge of the town.  A post office was established in the town in 1842.

The local parish church dates back to the mid-19th Century.

The Townagh flood

In December 1818, four lakes just outside Bangor Erris burst their banks after heavy rains, unleashing a torrent of water that killed 17 people. The majority of the victims were from the O'Hara family.  Three soldiers from the 92nd Highlanders were also killed. The soldiers were on revenue duty and were lodging with the O'Hara family.  All three soldiers were veterans of the Battle of Waterloo.  During the same storm, two other soldiers were killed when they got lost in the bog.

Irish War of Independence

In January 1921, a local man, Michael McAndrew (aged 27), was stabbed in the neck by a soldier. McAndrew was attempting to take the soldier's rifle when he received the wound.  He was taken to Belmullet Hospital where he survived the injury.

Transport
Bus Éireann route 446 links Bangor Erris with Bellacorick, Crossmolina and Ballina. In the reverse direction it links to Belmullet and the Mullet Peninsula. There are now four services a day in each direction, including Sundays. On Friday evenings an extra journey operates from Ballina. Onward rail and bus connections are available at Ballina.

Facilities

There are three public houses in Bangor - The Talk Of The Town, the Kiltane Tavern and the West End Bar.  Bangor has one supermarket/grocery shop, a bookmakers and a hardware store.  Bangor National School is attended by the children of Bangor and other neighboring villages such as Tawnagh and Bellacorick. Bangor Hibs have an all-weather astroturf pitch which is used for five-a-side football. Across from the national school is the Catholic church.

Sport
The GAA Club in Kiltane is Kiltane GFC.  Kiltane were founded in 1964 and wear blue and gold jerseys. They won the Junior and Intermediate Championships in 1972 and 1973 respectively. 

The soccer club in Bangor Erris is named Bangor Hibernians F.C. They play at Ballybeg Park. Founded in 1995 the club plays in the Premier division of the Mayo Association League. The club's colours are blue and black vertical stripes. The club crest denotes the "Big Bridge" in Bangor which carries traffic over the Owenmore River and is situated close to the club's home ground. The club's first major Junior Cup Final victory came against Partry Athletic in the Tonra Cup in 2006. In 2011, the club claimed the Tuohy Cup. Also in 2011, the team recorded a first ever League title (PREMIER B) following a 2–1 home win over local rivals Crossmolina. Bangor Hibs were named Mayo League Club of the Year in 2011. Bangor Hibs added a second League title in 2015 when they also won the Premier Division B title. As of 2018 the club are in the Mayo League Premier Division.

Notable people
 Johnny Carey, footballer.
 John McAndrew – A member of the 1950 and 1951 Mayo teams that won the All-Ireland. 
 Eileen Lynn Kato – A renowned academic and translator of Japanese poetry and theater. In 1991, she was appointed as Gakari (advisor) to the Japanese emperor.

Folklore 
The area around Bangor Erris is rich in local folklore. The legend of the Ulster Cycle took place not far from Bangor Erris at the fort at Rathmorgan beside Carrowmore Lake.  Known as Táin Bó Flidhais it tells the story of a cattle raid around the 1st century AD. 

There is a folktale that the road between Bangor Erris and Ballycroy is haunted by magical creatures.   A phantom dog sometimes appears, as does a white cow, whose appearance is regarded as a warning of death.  Several of the local lakes are associated with folk tales of 'water horses", which sometimes come onto the land and try to get people to mount them, and subsequently take them off into the  water.

See also
 List of towns and villages in Ireland

Further reading
 Noone, Fr. Sean. Where the Sun Sets (1991) Kildare.

References

Towns and villages in County Mayo
Erris